Anasca was a bryozoan sub-order under class Cheilostomida defined by the lack of an ascus in each zooid. It is no longer an accepted taxonomic grouping as it is considered a polyphyletic and/or paraphyletic grouping. The group is now subdivided into the suborders Inovicellata, Scrupariina, Malacostega, and Flustrina.

References 

Protostome suborders
Cheilostomatida
Obsolete animal taxa